Combos, officially called Combos Stuffed Snacks, are cylindrical tubes of cracker, pretzel, or tortilla, available with various fillings.

History
Combos Snacks, created in the early 1980s, are a snack food distributed by Mars, Incorporated, and sold throughout North America.  Though the pretzel form was produced first, Combos were first released in cracker form. They are also available with tortilla shells.

In mid-June 2016, some varieties of Combos were affected by an undeclared nut-related recall.

Production
Combos are produced by forming a soft bread-like dough, which is hollowed out into a tube-shaped form.  A cutter slices the dough into bite-sized lengths.  The snacks are then baked, cooled, and filled with the appropriate filling.

Flavors 

Combos are available in seven standard flavors:

 Cheddar Cheese Pretzel
 Pizzeria Pretzel
 Pepperoni Pizza Cracker
 Cheddar Cheese Cracker
 Buffalo Blue Cheese Pretzel
 Seven Layer Dip Tortilla
 Sweet & Salty Caramel Crème Pretzel
 Sweet & Salty Vanilla Frosting Pretzel

They also offer several limited edition or exclusive flavors:
 Honey Sriracha Pretzel
 Spicy Honey Mustard 
 Jalapeño Cheddar
 Cheddar Cheese Bacon Pretzel (Walgreens exclusive)
 Sweet Barbeque Baked Cracker (Walgreens exclusive)
 Garlic Parmesan Baked Cracker
Discontinued flavors include:

 Bacon, Egg, and Cheese Cracker
 Cheeseburger Cracker
 Mustard Pretzel
 Nacho Cheese Pretzel
 Zesty Salsa Tortilla
 Peanut Butter Pretzel
 Peanut Butter Cracker

Advertising
In 2006, Combos worked with TBWA and Agency.com to create the Man Mom campaign, and in 2008, Combos worked with Agency.com to create the Combos Nation campaign. Combos is an official sponsor of Kyle Busch, NASCAR driver of the number 18 Toyota Camry, whose car features other Mars, Incorporated products as well. Busch won the 2008 Best Buy 400 benefiting Student Clubs for Autism Speaks with Combos as the primary sponsor of his car.  It is the official cheese-filled snack of NASCAR.

In popular culture
 The 2000 Morphine song "Top Floor Bottom Buzzer" on the album The Night contains the lines, "There's a muchacha, teachin' me to mambo.  There's my buddy Pete eyein' a bowl of Combos."
 Rodney Rush played the character of Christian "Combo" Ortega on the show Breaking Bad, named after the snack.
 Comedian and actor Aziz Ansari references the snack in his 2015 book Modern Romance: An Investigation, saying, "Should I go out with this girl even though she listed Combos as one of her favorite snack foods? Combos!!?"
 The snack was featured on a February 2020 episode of the Bon Appétit YouTube channel series Gourmet Makes with Claire Saffitz.

References

External links

Brand name snack foods
Food and drink introduced in the 1980s
Mars confectionery brands